The Sikkim Nationalised Transport Bus Terminus is one of the most important bus terminal in North Bengal. It is located on Hill Cart Road, Siliguri, Darjeeling, adjacent to the Siliguri Junction railway station, about  New Jalpaiguri Railway Station. It is operated by Transport department, Government of Sikkim. Mainly Sikkim based bus service is available on this bus terminus.

Amenities 
 Parking 
 Washroom
 Restroom 
 Food-stall 
 Bookstore
 Newspaper seller
 Information center 
 24×7 Transit 
 Ola Cabs, Uber, Rapido (company) service available

Bus Route 

 Siliguri-Pakyong
 Siliguri-Jorethang
 Siliguri-Gangtok
 Siliguri-Mangan
 Siliguri-Pelling
 Siliguri-Rangpo
 Siliguri-Singtam
 Siliguri-Namchi
 Siliguri-Majitar
 Siliguri-Kumrek 
 Siliguri-Rongli
 Siliguri-Gyalshing
 Siliguri-Namthang
 Siliguri-Ravangla
 Siliguri-Chungthang

See also
 Tenzing Norgay Bus Terminus, Siliguri
 P.C. Mittal Memorial Bus Terminus, Siliguri

References

Bus stations in India
Transport in Siliguri